Luisa Spagnoli (30 October 1877, in Perugia – 21 September 1935, in Paris), was an Italian businesswoman, famous for creating a brand of women's clothing company and chocolate factory Perugina.

Perugina 
Spagnoli was born in Perugia in 30 October 1877.  With Giovanni Buitoni, she created the small company Perugina with its headquarters in the historical center of Perugia. Perugina initially began with 15 employees.

With the outbreak of World War I when men had to leave for the front, Spagnoli was left to carry on the business alone with her three children, including two sons Mario and Aldo, taking care of them all by herself. After the war, the Perugina factory grew to more than 100 employees.

In 1922, a brand of Italian chocolates called Baci ("Kisses") was created. The recipe for Baci now, nearly around 100 years since it was created, remains the same: dark chocolate, gianduia, chopped hazelnuts and crowned with a whole hazelnut.

By 1939, her chocolate brand Baci Perugina was so successful that it arrived in other countries including the US.

Angora Spagnoli

After the end of the war, Spagnoli created a new company, breeding poultry and angora rabbits.

In 1928, Spagnoli was the person to think of the idea of using angora yarn for knitwear including shawls, boleros, and fashionable garments which she trademarked l'Angora Spagnoli. At the Fiera di Milano exhibition, her innovation was showcased, and the activity of the company soon expanded.

Being diagnosed with throat cancer, Spagnoli was unable to witness the growth of her company, which began about four years later under the guidance of her son Mario. Giovanni Buitoni moved her to Paris to obtain  medical care available, remaining with her until her death in Paris in 1935 at the age of 58.

Industrial development 

Following her death, Spagnoli's son Mario (1900–1977) transitioned her company from fine crafts to a more industrialized focus in 1937. He was credited with the invention of a comb for collection of wool, and a clamp for tattooing angora rabbits, which were patented in 1942.

In 1947, Mario built the Città dell'angora (Angora city) factory, located at the center of a growing community. In the 1960s, he also founded the playground of the Città della Domenica originally called Spagnolia, that remains a destination for visitors to this day.

Under the leadership of Mario's son Hannibal (1927–1986), entrepreneur and president of Perugia Calcio, production diversified and the family created the network of Luisa Spagnoli shops.

There are now more than 100 shops throughout the world, with the headquarters still based in Perugia.

Notes and references

External links 
Luisa Spagnoli womenswear 
Perugina 
Baci Perugina 

People from Perugia
20th-century Italian businesswomen
20th-century Italian businesspeople
1935 deaths
1877 births
Chocolatiers